Mads Moldt (Born 28, January 2006), also known by his stage name Meum Zel, is a Danish singer. He is the winner of the Fifteenth season of the Danish version of the X Factor.

Performances during X Factor

Discography

References

External links 

Living people
2006 births
Participants in Danish reality television series